Rastrick High School is a mixed-gender 11-16 Secondary School, placed in the top 90 non selective schools nationally and in the top 20 schools regionally.

History
The school was formed in 1985 following the merger of Rastrick Grammar School and Reinswood Secondary School. However, its history can be traced back to 1621. The school is a technology specialist school and provides design and technology specialist equipment for student use.

Alumni

 Scott Benton, Conservative MP since 2019 for Blackpool South (1998-2005)

Rastrick Grammar School
 Christopher Paul Baker, travel writer and photographer, and adventure motorcyclist
 Richard Blakey a former England and Yorkshire cricketer.
 John Ellis, Labour MP for Bristol North West from 1966–70 and Brigg and Scunthorpe
 Sir (Albert) Larry Lamb, editor of the Daily Express from 1983–6 and of The Sun from 1969–72 and 1975–81
 Sir John E. Walker FRS, Professor of Molecular Bioenergetics at the University of Cambridge since 2002, and winner of the Nobel Prize in Chemistry in 1997 for discovery of an enzyme mechanism in the synthesis of Adenosine triphosphate (ATP)

References

External links
 Edubase
 Rastrick High School & 6th Form College Website

Academies in Calderdale
Educational institutions established in 1985
Secondary schools in Calderdale
1985 establishments in England